Sayed Ashraful Islam ( – 3 January 2019) was a Bangladesh Awami League politician. He was the General Secretary of the Bangladesh Awami League party. He served as a member of parliament and minister of public administration of the Government of Bangladesh. Islam also served for a time as Minister of Local Government and Rural Development.

Early life
Syed Ashraful Islam was the eldest son of Syed Nazrul Islam, acting president of the Mujibnagar government in 1971. Islam was a Mukti Bahini member during the Bangladesh Liberation War of 1971. He was involved in politics from the student life.  He became the General Secretary of greater Mymensingh District Chhatra League and assistant publicity secretary of the central unit. He also worked as the Acting General Secretary of Awami League after the arrest of its general secretary, Abdul Jalil.  He was also working as the spokesman of Bangladesh Awami League Party before serving as General Secretary of the Awami League.

Political career
In 1975, following the killing of Islam's father in prison along with three other national leaders, he immigrated to the United Kingdom and lived in London Borough of Tower Hamlets. Whilst living in Tower Hamlets, he was involved in Bangladeshi community activism and played an important role in formation of Bangladesh Youth League (BYL). He was elected as an Education Secretary of Federation of Bangladeshi Youth Organisation (FBYO) and worked at an education project based at Montefiore Centre in Tower Hamlets. Before immigrating to the United Kingdom, he completed Higher Secondary Certificate (HSC) in 1973 from Mymensingh Zillah School. He returned to Bangladesh in 1996 and was elected Member of Parliament (MP) from his home constituency, Kishoreganj Sadar, in the 7th national elections of Bangladesh.  He was elected an MP in the 2001 election as well.  He worked as a member of the parliamentary standing committee on foreign ministry. His electoral pledges include building up developed road and rail link from Dhaka to his home town, Kishoreganj. He was part of a committee to study the judicial pay scale.
Ashraful was re-elected from Kishoreganj-1 constituency in the 11th parliamentary election which was held on 30 December 2018.

Controversy
Islam questioned the role of Bangladesh in the Saudi-led military alliance against terror. He has criticised Bangladesh Bank and the Finance Ministry for the high rate of interest.

Criticism of Muhammad Yunus
Islam is known for his attacks on Nobel laureate and Grameen Bank founder Muhammad Yunus. In 2012, while addressing a program for farmers of cooperatives, he said:
His (Yunus's) basic subject is economics and he introduced microcredit programme, but did not get Nobel Prize in economics,
... He (Yunus) got Nobel Prize for Peace. But which war has he stopped with his activities and in which continent has he established peace through his microcredit program?
These days many of us know how one gets Nobel Prize. There are some countries in the world and a person's popularity increases once one has chips, cheese sandwiches and white wine in those countries.

Criticism of American diplomats
Islam also criticised American diplomats. In the same gathering where he criticised Muhammad Yunus, he criticised Secretary of State Hillary Clinton for a TV program on ATN Bangla, alleging that she and the moderator, Munni Saha, were "attempting to undermine Bangladesh."

In 2014, in a meeting in Khulna, Islam called the US Assistant Secretary for South and Central Asian Affairs Nisha Desai Biswal, who was on an official visit to Bangladesh, "a minister of two pennies," and added that said she "cannot change the power in Bangladesh." On the same occasion, he belittled the US Ambassador to Bangladesh, Dan Mozena, calling him "maid Marzina."

Illness
In November 2018, Islam was diagnosed with stage-4 lung cancer. He died on 3 January 2019 in Bangkok, Thailand.

References

1952 births
2019 deaths
Awami League politicians
General Secretaries of Awami League
9th Jatiya Sangsad members
Mukti Bahini personnel
Local Government, Rural Development and Co-operatives ministers
Public Administration ministers of Bangladesh
Deaths from lung cancer
Deaths from cancer in Thailand
State Ministers of Tourism and Civil Aviation (Bangladesh)
People from Kishoreganj District
10th Jatiya Sangsad members
Bangladeshi people of Arab descent